Nelson and Colne was a constituency in Lancashire which returned one Member of Parliament (MP)  to the House of Commons of the Parliament of the United Kingdom from 1918 until it was abolished for the 1983 general election.

It was largely succeeded by the Pendle constituency.

Boundaries
1918–1950: The Boroughs of Nelson and Colne, the Urban Districts of Barrowford, Brierfield, and Trawden, and the detached part of the parish of Foulridge which was bordered on the north, west and south by the Borough of Colne.

1950–1983: The Boroughs of Nelson and Colne, and the Urban Districts of Barrowford, Brierfield, and Trawden.

Members of Parliament

Elections

Elections in the 1910s

Elections in the 1920s

Elections in the 1930s

Elections in the 1940s

Elections in the 1950s

Elections in the 1960s

Elections in the 1970s

References

Parliamentary constituencies in North West England (historic)
Constituencies of the Parliament of the United Kingdom established in 1918
Constituencies of the Parliament of the United Kingdom disestablished in 1983
Borough of Pendle